17th Street/Santa Monica College station is an at-grade light rail station in the Los Angeles County Metro Rail system located near the intersection of 17th Street and Colorado Avenue in Santa Monica, California. It is served by the E Line.

History 
The interurban Santa Monica Air Line ran south of Colorado on a private right-of-way in this area. While the E Line follows the Air Line's right-of-way for much of its route,  the line and its stations in this area were moved to the median of Colorado Boulevard per a request from the City of Santa Monica during its design phase.

Service

Station layout 

The station is located in the Midtown District of Santa Monica, in the center of Colorado Avenue west of 17th Street, adjacent to Memorial Park: the City of Santa Monica refers to this station area as the "Memorial Park Neighborhood Transit Village".  It is three blocks from Santa Monica College.

The east end of the station is at 17th Street and the west end of the station is mid-block between 15th and 16th Streets with entrances at either end.  Parking and an off-street bus stop is located just south of Colorado between 16th and 17th Streets.

Hours and frequency

Connections 
, the following connections are available:
 Big Blue Bus (Santa Monica): 41, 42, 44

References

External links 
Metro Expo Line Construction Authority
Project Website, Metro Rail Expo Corridor, Phase 2 to Culver City

E Line (Los Angeles Metro) stations
Buildings and structures in Santa Monica, California
Railway stations in the United States opened in 2016
2016 establishments in California
Transportation in Santa Monica, California
Santa Monica College